Farney is a barony in County Monaghan, Republic of Ireland.

Etymology

Farney takes its name from the ancient kingdom of Fernmag ("plain of alders").

Location

Farney is found in southeast County Monaghan, north of the River Lagan, west of the River Fane and south of Lough Muckno.

Farney is bordered to the north by Cremorne, County Monaghan; to the east by Dundalk Upper, Louth and Ardee, County Louth; to the south by Lower Slane, County Meath; and to the west by Clankee, County Cavan.

History
O'Ciaran or O'Kieran is given as a chief of Fearnmuigh as a clan of Tír Eoghain. The O'Larkin sept is cited as chiefs alongside the O'Neills and MacCanns in the old territory of Airgíalla (Oriel), where they were chiefs of Farney and West Uí Breasail (in County Armagh). O Cosgro (ve) (O Cosgraigh) was the name of the chiefs of Feara Ruis (Fir Rois) near Carrickmacross and Ardee. MacArdle, a branch of the MacMahons of Oriel are noted here, as well as septs of Callan, O'Finn, O'Larkin, Hughes/Hayes, and O'Donegan.

List of settlements

Below is a list of settlements in Farney barony:
Carrickmacross
Inniskeen

References

External links
McMahon, Lords of Farney

Baronies of County Monaghan